Utaiwan Kaensing (RTGS: Uthaiwan Kaensing) is a member of the Thailand women's national volleyball team.

Clubs
  Idea Khonkaen (2008–2013)
  VTV Binh Dien Long An Club (2008–2009)
  University of Santo Tomas (2011–2012)
  Suan Sunandha (2011–2012)
  Sisaket (2013–2015)
  Supreme Chonburi (2015–2016)

Awards

Individual
 2012 Shakey's V-League – "Best Blocker"
 2012 Shakey's V-League 1st Conference – "Best Spiker"

References

1988 births
Living people
Volleyball players at the 2010 Asian Games
Utaiwan Kaensing
Utaiwan Kaensing
Utaiwan Kaensing
Southeast Asian Games medalists in volleyball
Competitors at the 2009 Southeast Asian Games
Competitors at the 2011 Southeast Asian Games
Utaiwan Kaensing
Utaiwan Kaensing
Utaiwan Kaensing